Kseniia Alexeyevna Sinitsyna (born 5 August 2004) is a Russian figure skater. She is the 2020 Youth Olympic silver medalist, the 2020 Youth Olympic Champion in the team event, the 2019 JGP Italy champion, the JGP Russia silver medalist, and the 2018 JGP Lithuania bronze medalist.

Personal life 
Sinitsyna was born on 5 August 2004 in Tver.

Career

Early years
Sinitsyna began learning to skate in 2008. She finished 9th at the 2018 Russian Junior Championships.

2018–2019 season: Junior international debut
In the 2018–2019 season, Sinitsyna debuted in the ISU Junior Grand Prix series, taking the bronze medal at the 2018 JGP Lithuania.

At the 2019 Russian Junior Championships in February, she finished fourth behind Alexandra Trusova, Alena Kostornaia, and Anna Shcherbakova.

Sinitsyna then represented Russia in Sakhalin at the first Children of Asia Games, winning the bronze medal behind You Young and Alena Kanysheva.

In March 2019, Sinitsyna represented Russia, alongside countrymates Alexandra Trusova and Anna Shcherbakova, at the World Junior Championships in Zagreb, Croatia after Alena Kostornaia withdrew due to a medical condition. Ranked fourth in the short and sixth in the free skate, Sinitsyna finished fourth overall.

2019–2020 season: Youth Olympics

For the 2019–20 season, Sinitsyna was assigned to 2019 JGP USA in Lake Placid, New York. However, she withdrew due to visa issues. She was reassigned to 2019 JGP Russia in Chelyabinsk, Russia, where she won the silver medal with a score of 204.25 behind Kamila Valieva. At the 2019 JGP Italy, Sinitsyna placed first in both the short program and the free skate with new personal best scores and won her first Junior Grand Prix gold medal. These results qualified her to the 2019–20 Junior Grand Prix Final, where she placed fourth.

At the 2020 Russian Championships, an error in the short program led to her placing fifteenth, but she climbed to fifth place overall with a fourth-place finish in the free skate.

Sinitsyna won the silver medal at the 2020 Winter Youth Olympics behind You Young of South Korea and ahead of Russian teammate Anna Frolova. In the team event, she placed first individually to help her team (Arlet Levandi of Estonia, Alina Butaeva / Luka Berulava of Georgia, and Utana Yoshida / Shingo Nishiyama of Japan) win the gold medal.

Sinitsyna placed seventh at the 2020 Russian Junior Championships after falling on the downgraded combination in the short program. Therefore, Sinitsyna did not qualify for the 2020 World Junior Championships but was named the first alternative.

2020–2021 season
Sinitsyna injured her leg over the summer before the start of the 2020–21 season and subsequently became ill, causing her to miss the domestic fall competitive season and the 2021 Russian Championships. She returned to the competition in early February of 2021, winning the domestic Prizes of Elena Tchaikovskaia competition. She attempted a quad toe loop for the first time at the event but popped it into a single despite landing it successfully during her warm-up. This marked the first time Sinitsyna attempted a quadruple jump in competition.

2021–2022 season: Senior international debut
Sinitsyna debuted her programs for the 2021–22 season at the 2021 Russian test skate event in early September, where she skated her short program cleanly but made several mistakes in her free program, including falling on an attempted quad toe loop. Sinitsyna and her team decided to remove the quad from her free skate in advance of her first Grand Prix assignment, the 2021 Skate America, due to an injury.

At Skate America, Sinitsyna skated a clean short program to place third in the segment behind compatriots Alexandra Trusova and Daria Usacheva. She was fifth in the free skate, dropping to fifth place overall. She was again third after the short program at her second event, the 2021 Internationaux de France, dropping to fourth overall after the free skate with three underrotated triple jumps.

Competing at the 2022 Russian Championships, Sinitsyna placed ninth.

Programs

Competitive highlights 

GP: Grand Prix; JGP: Junior Grand Prix

Detailed results 
Small medals for short and free programs awarded only at ISU Championships.

Senior

Junior

References

External links 

 
 

2004 births
Living people
Russian female single skaters
Figure skaters from Moscow
Figure skaters at the 2020 Winter Youth Olympics